Mehdipatnam is a locality in the Southwestern part of Hyderabad, India.  It is located north of the Musi River near Asif Nagar and is named after Mehdi Nawaz Jung, a politician and bureaucrat of the Hyderabad State.

Large Masjids are located in this region. Due to the recent developments in the last few decades, it has become commercial center known for its Gold Market and Shopping comple

Legislature 
In the Lok Sabha it belongs to the Hyderabad constituency with the current MP being Assaduddin Owasi.

In the Telangana Legislative Assembly (Vidhan Sabha) it is in the Nampally constituency with Jaffer Hussain being the current MLA

Finally in the Greater Hyderabad Municipal Corporation its Corporator is Majid Hussain who was also the Former Mayor of Hyderabad.

Commercial Areas 
Due to the enormous development Mehdipatnam has seen over the last two decades, the close proximity to other commercial centers and its transport system it has become a center of shopping for many suburbs.

Gold market 
Mehdipatnam houses the Okaz Complex has numerous jewelry stores like Mujtaba Jewelers, Sri Krishna Jewelers, Danish Jewelers and Malabar Gold and Diamonds are among the few.

Food 
Restaurants serving North Indian food include Prince Hotel, Prince Café and Restaurant, City Diamond Hotel, Paradise Hotel, Al Baik Shwarma Center, etc which serves Hyderabadi food.

Fast-food restaurants like Subway, McDonald's, Dominos Pizza, KFC and Pizza Hut have been set up franchises here recently.

Swathi Tiffins is one of the oldest tiffin centers in Hyderabad is favorite among the locals. And sweet shops like Delhiwala Sweets and Chat, G. Pulla Reddy Sweets, etc are available.

The fast food franchises and the haleem served here during Ramadhan have made this place a hotspot.

Entertainment 
Mehdipatnam has a lot of movie theaters and multiplexes which entertain the local crowd on a daily basis. Amba Theater, Eswar Theater, Galaxy Theater and Asian Multiplex include the most prominent ones.

Function Halls 
The most notable marriage/function is the Kings Palace and Kings Kohinoor Convention (both managed by Red Rose Palace) Others include MP Garden Function Hall, Mahboob Mansion,etc that are rented out for marriages or other ceremonies

Hospitals & Clinics 
Sarojini Devi Eye Hospital is located here. It is a government hospital serving patients free of cost. Jayabhushan Hospital is the oldest multi-specialty hospital here.

Other significant hospitals include Anusha hospital, Olive Hospital, Vasan Eye Care, Mina Multi Specialty Hospital, Premier Hospital, and MM Hospital. Many medical clinics can be found here.

Transport 
Mehdipatnam has a TSRTC bus depot, making it a hub of many buses bound to all parts of the city. It acts as a connector of various regions across the city like Chevella, Moinabad, Uppal, Secundrabad, Lingampally, Koti, Gachibowli, Madhapur, Aramghar and others.

It also provides connectivity to the Rajiv Gandhi International Airport through the PV Narasimha Rao Expressway.

The closest MMTS Train stations are at Nampally and Lakdikapool.

Education 
There are many schools and colleges here catering to students of all budgets.

The St. Ann's College for Women is located here and along with the G. Pulla Reddy Educational Institutions, Prof. K. Nagi Reddy Educational & Cultural Society, Lal Bahadur Degree College

The schools of this locality include:
Hidayah Islamic International School
 Blooms Beyond Institute of Developmental Skills
 Blooming Buds Techno High School
 M.S. Creative School
 M.S High School
 Safdariya Girls Urdu Medium School
 Bright Star School
 Gowtham Model School
 Silicon Valley School
 Sri Chaitanya Techno School
 Happy Scholars
 Delhi Public School
 Vivekananda High School
 G. Narayanamma High School (Opp Mehdipatnam Bus Depot)
 Sharp scholar school
 Peace Angles High School
 Sunrise High School 
Crystal high school.

Religious Places

Masjid-e-Azizia 

Masjid-e-Azizia is the largest mosque in Mehdipatnam and is the headquarter of the Students Islamic Organization of India and Islamic Center of Jamaat-e-Islami Hind. It consists of four floors with Wudu Khana (Place of Ablution) on every floor.

It witnesses a crowd of more than 7000 during Ramadan. The Friday sermons are delivered both in Urdu and Arabic, which are chiefly focused on current/contemporary issues.

Rajarajeshwari Temple 

Located in Ramamurthy Colony, Mehdipatnam.

Khaja Gulshan Masjid 
It is a center of Ahl-e-Sunnat ul Jamaat. It is one of the oldest mosques with many sermons and speeches given by famous people. The dome is lit during the holy month of Ramadan making it the center of attraction.

Masjid-e-Gumbad 
Located in the Ayodhya Nagar colony. This mosque is currently under construction. Construction of the mosque started in early 2006. The land was subject to legal hassles before the construction took place. People used to pray on the barren land without any roof or covering 5 times a day battling the extreme heat of summers, rains and the winter. The area consists of a dome-shaped mausoleum dating back many years. The ongoing plan includes the construction of 4 tall minarets and a large dome. The construction is under progress. This huge mosque has the capacity to accommodate as many as 3000 people.

Methodist Church 
Located in Santosh Nagar.

Qutub Shai Masjid (Choti Masjid) 
Located in Arab lane, Murad Nagar. This mosque is also known as Choti Masjid.

Masjid E Banu Wa Faiyaz 
This mosque is located in the vicinity of St Ann's College at Santosh Nagar.

Masjid e Mohammedia 
Located in Hill Colony, Vishwash Nagar.

Neighbourhoods 
Laxminagar Colony 
Humayun Nagar
Karwan
Jiyaguda
Murad Nagar
Navodaya Colony
Rama Murthy Colony
Santosh Nagar colony
Kanthinagar Colony
Amba Gardens
Padmanabha Nagar Colony 
Vishwasnagar Colony
Ayodhyanagar
Sarada Nagar
Gudimalkapur
SBI Colony
LIC Colony
Jaya Nagar Colony
Dilshadnagar Colony
Attapur 
Upperpally 
Hyderguda

References

External links

Neighbourhoods in Hyderabad, India